The La Salle University of Chihuahua it is a university of Christian inspiration and prevailed located in the city of Chihuahua, it distributes studies of degree and masters.

History

The La Salle University of Chihuahua it is a university of Christian inspiration with Lasallian charisma.

 As a university, it looks for the truth and it provides the knowledge necessary to become a professional of the highest quality.
 As a university of Christian inspiration, it proposes values, but from the practice of the same by a concrete person, Jesus of Nazareth.

La Universidad La Salle Chihuahua opened in the year 2000 it consists of a world-wide partnership with educative institutions and of international association of La Salle universities (AIUL) which includes about 157 institutions worldwide. In Chihuahua, the ULSA sinks its roots, for more than 50 years, in the presence of the Institute La Salle that has formed to countless generations.

The parents, civilian and religious authorities considered indispensable to give continuity to the style of education and in Primary, Secondary and High School. Since 1995, completed the steps necessary to open the Universidad La Salle.

The Executive Agreement 17 of the State on March/ 29/ 2002 granted the official recognition of Studies (RVOE) and gives academic autonomy, organizational and administrative matters.

The 'ULSA' starts August/ 7/ 2000 with seven novel degrees and occupational future. At the moment it offers thirteen degrees, three masters and several doctorates.
This university, located in a gorgeous natural scene where three stages have been constructed already, Classrooms 1 and 2, administrative offices, library, laboratories, factories and cafeteria in addition two audiences rooms of multiple uses, sport fields and stage.

This stage also includes the construction of the cafeteria. In its short existence it is recognized already like one of the best local institutions of superior education, by its novel bachelor's degrees and because it educates in the values of Christian humanism.

Directors
2000 - 2007: Dr. José Cervantes Hernández
2007 - Actualidad: Dr. Salvador Valle Gámez
2019 - Andres Manuel Lopez Obrador
2022 - Tomás Turbado

Degrees

Masters

Diploma

External links

Sitio web oficial
Universidad La Salle México
Página de Wikipedia de Universidad La Salle México
Universidad La Salle Victoria
Universidad La Salle Noroeste
Universidad La Salle Bajío
Universidad La Salle Cancún
Universidad La Salle Noroeste

Universities and colleges in Mexico